Jejak Rasul (Malay: The Footpath of the Prophets) is a Malaysian Islamic documentary television series. The show is broadcast on TV3 since 1996 and is always broadcast daily during the Ramadan fasting month, typically in the late afternoon or in the evening a few hours before the breaking of fast.

It has been rerunning daily on TV3 at 5:30 am as of 2012 while its early episodes have been reran on TV9, Astro Oasis and on the Emas channel as well as Salam HD on TM's unifitv (formerly known as Hypp TV). In 2017, TV Alhijrah reran the first season daily during Ramadan while obscuring the original TV3 logo.

In 2018, TV3 decided to rerun one of the seasons which is 2013 Ramadhan in 3 Holy Lands – Ramadan di 3 Tanah Suci. This decision is likely because of the declining revenue made by Media Prima. Surprisingly, during 2018 eid season, TV3 aired a pilot episode of the new Jejak Rasul series which is Jejak Rasul Ulul Azmi (The Arch Prophet) hosted by Ahmad Fedtri Yahya. On the episode, it had been mentioned that The Arch Prophet will be the main theme for the 2019 season and the other following seasons to come (There are five Arch-prophets in Islam; Nuh (Noah), Ibrahim (Abraham), Musa (Moses), Isa (Jesus) and Muhammad). In 2019, TV3 aired Jejak Rasul Ulul Azmi focusing on Prophet Musa (Moses) as the theme. For 2020 season, Prophet Nuh (Noah) and Ibrahim (Abraham) become the main focus of the season. For the third time Ahmad Fedtri Yahya hosted the series and this time the crews explore Turkey and Jordan.

Due to COVID-19 pandemic that lead to travel restrictions, the third season of Jejak Rasul Ulul Azmi was postponed. Instead, the Jejak Rasul crew will explore Islam on their own country - Malaysia.

The show's episodes have also been released in VHS and DVD formats. The show has also inspired other local TV stations to air documentaries similar to this format such as Ayat Riwayat on TV Alhijrah, Syahadah on TV1 and Al-Risaalah on TV9.

List of seasons

Sponsors 
 Olive House
 Agro Bank
 Celcom
 Mofaz Corporation
 Johor Corporation
 Bank Islam
 RHB Islamic Bank
 Persatuan Pengimport dan Kenderaan Melayu Malaysia (PEKEMA) in season 20.
 V'asia Cosmetic & Healthcare
 Department of Museums Malaysia (Jabatan Muzium Malaysia) 
 Baraka Pharmaniaga
 Kao Corporation Malaysia
 Arastu

International broadcast 
:
 RTB

:
 TPI
 Trans TV
 TVRI (2020–present)
 Kompas TV (2012-?)

References

External links
 

1995 Malaysian television series debuts
1990s Malaysian television series
2000s Malaysian television series
2010s Malaysian television series
TV3 (Malaysia) original programming